Sword Stained with Royal Blood is a wuxia Hong Kong television series adapted from Louis Cha's novel of the same title. It was first broadcast on TVB in Hong Kong in 1985. It has a total of 20 episodes.

Cast
 Note: Some of the characters' names are in Cantonese romanisation.

 Felix Wong as Yun Sing-chi
 Fung Chi-fung as young Yun Sing-chi
 Patricia Ching Yee Chong as Wan Ching-ching / Ha Ching-ching
 Teresa Mo as Ah-kau / Princess Cheung-ping
 Michael Miu as Ha Suet-yee
 Regina Tsang as Wan Yee
 Lawrence Ng as Lei Ngam
 Rebecca Chan as Ho Tit-sau
 Ko Miu-see as Ho Hong-yeuk
 Kiki Sheung as Kiu Yuen-yee
 Ho Pik-sang as On Siu-wai
 Chan Fuk-sang as Suen Chung-kwan
 Toi Chi-wai as Man Chi-wah
 Francis Ng as Lo Lap-yu
 Bobby Au-yeung as Mui Kim-wo
 Kwok Fung as Yuk-tsan-tsi
 Shih Kien as Muk Yan-ching
 Lam Tin as Taoist Muk-song
 Kenneth Tsang as Yun Sung-wan
 Chan Ka-yee as On Tai-neung
 Lau Kwok-shing as Uncle Nga
 Felix Lok as Cho Fa-shun
 Chu Tit-wo as Lei Tsi-sing
 Amy Wu as Chan Yuen-yuen
 Cheung Ying-choi as Sung-ching Emperor
 Chun Wong as To Lung
 Yip Tin-hang as Kwai Sun-shu
 Leung San as Kwai Yee-neung
 Ho Kwai-lam as Wong Chan
 Tam Chuen-hing as Jiu Kung-lai
 Luk Ying-hong as Sing Ching-chuk
 Chan Kwok-kuen as Hung Shing-hoi
 Leung Siu-tik as Chui Chau-san
 Ng Man-tat as Wong-toi-kik

References

External links

1985 Hong Kong television series debuts
1985 Hong Kong television series endings
TVB dramas
Works based on Sword Stained with Royal Blood
Hong Kong wuxia television series
Television series set in the Ming dynasty
1980s Hong Kong television series
Cantonese-language television shows
Television shows based on works by Jin Yong
Television series set in the 17th century